Hsu Yen-pu (born 1961) is a Republic of China Army general. Since 1 July 2021, he is the current Commander of the Republic of China Army. He also served as the Deputy Chief of Staff of the Republic of China Armed Forces from 2020 to 2021.

Career 
Hsu is of mixed Atayal and Han descent. He is the first commander of the army with Taiwanese indigenous ancestry.

In 2014, Hsu was promoted from major general to lieutenant general.

On 15 January 2020, the Ministry of National Defense announced that Hsu would be transferred to be the Deputy Chief of Staff of the Republic of China Armed Forces. The changes took effect on 16 January. On 17 January, Hsu was personally awarded the rank by President Tsai Ing-wen in a ceremony. 

On 1 July 2021, Hsu became the Commander of the Army.

Awards 

  Order of the Sacred Tripod with Special Cravat
  Order of the Resplendent Banner with Yellow Grand Cordon
  Order of the Resplendent Banner with Grand Cordon

References 

1961 births
Living people
Republic of China Army generals
People from Taipei
Atayal people